Imagine No Malaria (INM) is a comprehensive anti-malaria campaign run by The United Methodist Church.

The ministry mission statement is: Imagine No Malaria is an extraordinary effort of the people of The United Methodist Church, putting faith into action to end preventable deaths by malaria in Africa, especially the death of a child or a mother.
As a life-saving ministry, Imagine No Malaria aims to raise $75 million to empower the people of Africa to overcome malaria’s burden. Imagine No Malaria works in partnership with the United Nations Foundation and the Global Fund to reduce the number of deaths caused by Malaria in African countries.

Leadership
Bishop Thomas Bickerton is the chairperson of the executive committee for Imagine No Malaria.  He stated, "Today there's a 3-year-old who's going to be bitten by a tiny bug, and, in 48 hours, she is going to die.  She's the reason I do what I do.  To make the world a healthy place for every child has everything to do with what Mr. Wesley intended us to do."

Strategy
Imagine No Malaria is a fundraising and advocacy campaign to support a comprehensive, integrated anti-malaria strategy in Africa. This program is focused on delivering four key components: prevention, treatment, education, and communications.

Prevention
Building on the success of Nothing But Nets, Imagine No Malaria is often thought of as Nets Plus. Insecticide-treated mosquito nets are still the best way to prevent malaria, however, other measures like draining standing water where the insects breed, trimming foliage and proper sanitation, are also critical to preventing malaria.

Treatment
The United Methodist Church has been working in Africa for more than 160 years.  The church has the infrastructure of more than 300 clinics and hospitals in Africa to treat many patients.  The Imagine No Malaria campaign has the goal of getting medicines and diagnostic tests to those hospitals and clinics.

Education
The program provides training for local community health workers to educate people on the symptoms and defenses against malaria, as well as educating them about how to use their bed nets.

Communications
The program provides education on malaria and information through its vast radio network in Africa.  The campaign also delivers solar powered and hand-crank radios to African women.

Fundraising
Imagine No Malaria is using current technology in its strive to achieve its $75 million fundraising goal. Donations can be made through text messages as well as in traditional ways.  The operational costs for Imagine No Malaria are covered by a grant, awarded by the United Nations Foundation. This allows the effort to ensure that 100% of funds raised are used to support for malaria programs in Africa.

In 2014, The INM programme held a conference, in which they revealed that they were able to raise more than $40 million.

Advocacy
Imagine No Malaria also includes an advocacy effort that calls for support by urging elected officials in Congress to protect global health funds (which includes international malaria aid) in the US budget. Recent efforts include events in Washington, DC, hosted by the General Board of Church and Society and a mobile SMS (text) campaign asking individuals to text the word SWAT to 27722 and sign a "petition to save lives." The petition is part of a toolkit that will be used to persuade elected officials to reject proposed cuts to malaria funding as proposed in the initial FY13 budget.

Partners
The United Methodist Church is working on this project in conjunction with partners of a religious and secular nature.  Partners include the World Health Organization, the United Nations Foundation, the Global Fund to Fight AIDS, Tuberculosis and Malaria, the Bill and Melinda Gates Foundation, the Red Crescent Society.

Results
The Imagine No Malaria campaign has seen success in many different areas in Africa.  In April 2010, in a coordinated effort with many different religious faiths and institutions, 25,000 bed nets were distributed in Lubumbashi, DRC.   In another effort, the program distributed 5,000 bed nets in Nyadire, Zimbabwe.

See also
 Nothing But Nets - An earlier anti-malaria campaign supported by the United Methodist Church
 Thomas Bickerton - The United Methodist bishop who helped create Imagine No Malaria

References

External links
 Official Website 
 Nothing But Nets

Malaria organizations
United Methodist Church
Medical and health organizations based in Tennessee